Nakhon Phanom Provincial Administrative Organization Stadium or Nakhon Phanom Province Stadium is a multi-purpose stadium in Nakhon Phanom Province, Thailand. It is currently used mostly for football matches and is the home stadium of Nakhon Phanom F.C. The stadium holds 2,406 people.

Football venues in Thailand
Multi-purpose stadiums in Thailand
Buildings and structures in Nakhon Phanom province
Sport in Nakhon Phanom province